A by-election was held for the New South Wales Legislative Assembly electorate of Paddington on 12 January 1888 because William Trickett was appointed to the Legislative Council.

Dates

Candidates

 William Allen (Protectionist) was a soap manufacturer. His brother Alfred was one of the sitting Free Trade members for Paddington

 Charles Cansdell (Free Trade) was a barrister, former Crown Prosecutor and Acting Judge of the District Court. This was his third and final time as a candidate, having previously been unsuccessful in 1877 (Windsor) and 1885 (Paddington).

 Charles Hellmrich (Free Trade) was an architect, alderman in the Paddington Municipal Council and former Mayor of Paddington. This was his second of three attempts for Paddington, having previously been unsuccessful in 1885 (Paddington).  He stood unsuccessfully for a final time in 1891.

 Edward Knapp (Free Trade) was a surveyor and member of the Local Option League. This was the only time he stood for parliament.

Result

William Trickett was appointed to the Legislative Council.

Aftermath
With a margin of just 14 votes, Charles Hellmrich challenged the result in the Elections and Qualifications Committee. The Committee consisted of 2 Free Trade members (Jacob Garrard and Albert Gould) and 3 Protectionist members (Joseph Palmer Abbott, Robert Smith and John See). The committee scrutinised the ballot papers and held that Allen was properly elected, finding that the true result was Allen 1,689, Hellmrich 1,653, Knapp 608 and Cansdell 191, formal 4,141, informal 114, total 4,255.

See also
Electoral results for the district of Paddington
List of New South Wales state by-elections

References

1888 elections in Australia
New South Wales state by-elections
1880s in New South Wales